Thomas Charles Brady (1 May 1892 – 17 July 1945) was an Australian rules footballer who played with Geelong in the Victorian Football League (VFL).

Notes

External links 

1892 births
1945 deaths
Australian rules footballers from Victoria (Australia)
Geelong Football Club players
Chilwell Football Club players